Feriola insularis is a species of parasitic fly in the family Tachinidae.

Distribution
China, Russia.

References

Diptera of Asia
Dexiinae
Insects described in 1986
Insects of Russia
Insects of China